This is a list of schools in the Metropolitan Borough of Dudley, West Midlands, England.

State-funded schools

Primary schools

Alder Coppice Primary School, Sedgley
Amblecote Primary School, Amblecote
Ashwood Park Primary School, Wordsley
Beechwood CE Primary School, Dudley
Belle Vue Primary School, Wordsley
Blanford Mere Primary School, Kingswinford
Blowers Green Primary School, Dudley
Bramford Primary School, Coseley
Brierley Hill Primary School, Brierley Hill
Brockmoor Primary School, Brockmoor
Bromley Hills Primary School, Kingswinford
The Bromley-Pensnett Primary School, Pensnett
Brook Primary School, Wordsley
Caslon Primary Community School, Halesowen
Christ Church CE Primary School, Coseley
Church of the Ascension CE Primary School, Wall Heath
Colley Lane Primary Academy, Halesowen
Cotwall End Primary School, Sedgley
Cradley CE Primary School, Cradley
Crestwood Park Primary School, Kingswinford
Dawley Brook Primary School, Kingswinford
Dingle Community Primary School, Kingswinford
Dudley Wood Primary School, Dudley
Fairhaven Primary School, Wordsley
Foxyards Primary School, Coseley
Gig Mill Primary School, Norton
Glynne Primary School, Kingswinford
Greenfield Primary School, Stourbridge
Halesowen CE Primary School, Halesowen
Ham Dingle Primary Academy, Pedmore
Hawbush Primary School, Brierley Hill
Hob Green Primary School, Stourbridge
Howley Grange Primary School, Halesowen
Huntingtree Primary School, Halesowen
Hurst Green Primary School, Halesowen
Hurst Hill Primary School, Hurst Hill
Jesson's CE Primary School, Dudley
Kates Hill Primary School, Dudley
Lapal Primary School, Halesowen
Lutley Primary School, Halesowen
Maidensbridge Primary School, Wall Heath
Manor Way Primary Academy, Halesowen
Milking Bank Primary School, Milking Bank
Mount Pleasant Primary School, Quarry Bank
Netherbrook Primary School, Netherton
Netherton CE Primary School, Netherton
Newfield Park Primary School, Halesowen
Northfield Road Primary School, Netherton
Oldswinford CE Primary School, Stourbridge
Olive Hill Primary Academy, Halesowen
Our Lady and St Kenelm RC School, Halesowen
Pedmore CE Primary School, Pedmore
Peters Hill Primary School, Amblecote
Priory Primary School, Dudley
Quarry Bank Primary School, Quarry Bank
Queen Victoria Primary School, Sedgley
Red Hall Primary School, Lower Gornal
The Ridge Primary School, Wollaston
Roberts Primary School, Lower Gornal
Rufford Primary School, Stourbridge
Russells Hall Primary School, Dudley
St Chad's RC Primary School, Sedgley
St James's CE Primary School, Wollaston
St Joseph's RC Primary School, Dudley
St Joseph's RC Primary School, Stourbridge
St Margaret's at Hasbury CE Primary School, Hasbury
St Mark's CE Primary School, Pensnett
St Mary's CE Primary School, Kingswinford
St Mary's RC Primary School, Brierley Hill
Sledmere Primary School, Dudley
Straits Primary School, Lower Gornal
Tenterfields Primary Academy, Halesowen
Thorns Primary School, Quarry Bank
Wallbrook Primary Academy, Coseley
Withymoor Primary School, Brierley Hill
Wollescote Primary School, Wollescote
Woodside Primary School, Woodside
Wrens Nest Primary School, Dudley

Secondary schools

Beacon Hill Academy, Sedgley
Bishop Milner Catholic College, Dudley
The Crestwood School, Kingswinford
Dormston School, Sedgley
The Earls High School, Halesowen
Ellowes Hall Sports College, Lower Gornal
Kingswinford Academy, Kingswinford
Leasowes High School, Halesowen
The Link Academy, Netherton
Old Swinford Hospital, Stourbridge
Pedmore High School, Pedmore
Pegasus Academy, Dudley
Redhill School, Stourbridge
Ridgewood High School, Wollaston
St James Academy, Dudley
Summerhill School, Kingswinford
Thorns Collegiate Academy, Quarry Bank
Windsor High School, Halesowen
The Wordsley School, Wordsley

Special and alternative schools

The Brier School, Kingswinford
Cherry Tree Learning Centre, Dudley
Halesbury School, Halesowen
The Old Park School, Brierley Hill
Pens Meadow School, Wordsley
Rosewood School, Coseley
Sutton School, Dudley
Sycamore Short Stay School, Dudley
Woodsetton School, Woodsetton

Further education
Birmingham Metropolitan College (Stourbridge Campus)
Dudley College of Technology
Halesowen College
King Edward VI College

Independent schools

Primary and preparatory schools
The King Alfred School, Lower Gornal

Senior and all-through schools
Elmfield Rudolf Steiner School, Stourbridge

Special and alternative schools
Impact Independent School, Haden Hill
Priory Park Community School, Dudley
The Rowan School, Coseley
The Wenlock School, Dudley

See also
Defunct schools in the Metropolitan Borough of Dudley

Dudley
Schools in the Metropolitan Borough of Dudley